Elaine L. Wells (born May 26, 1951) is an American politician who served as a member of the Kansas House of Representatives from 1987 to 1994. A resident of Carbondale, Kansas, she represented the 13th and 59th House districts. Wells was initially elected as a Democrat, but changed parties to become a Republican on May 16, 1989.

References

1951 births
Living people
Democratic Party members of the Kansas House of Representatives
Republican Party members of the Kansas House of Representatives
20th-century American politicians
20th-century American women politicians
Women state legislators in Kansas
People from Osage County, Kansas